Ingrid Lizbeth Aranda Javes (born 21 December 1992) is a Peruvian karateka. She won the gold medal in the women's individual kata event at the 2018 South American Games held in Cochabamba, Bolivia. In 2019, she won one of the bronze medals in the women's individual kata event at the Pan American Games held in Lima, Peru.

Career 

In 2018, she won the gold medal in the women's individual kata event at the South American Games held in Cochabamba, Bolivia. In the same year, she also competed in the women's individual kata event at the 2018 World Karate Championships held in Madrid, Spain.

In June 2021, she competed at the World Olympic Qualification Tournament held in Paris, France hoping to qualify for the 2020 Summer Olympics in Tokyo, Japan. In November 2021, she competed at the World Karate Championships held in Dubai, United Arab Emirates.

She won the silver medal in the women's kata event at the 2022 Bolivarian Games held in Valledupar, Colombia. She won one of the bronze medals in her event at the 2022 South American Games held in Asunción, Paraguay.

Achievements

References

External links 
 

Living people
1992 births
Place of birth missing (living people)
Peruvian female karateka
Pan American Games medalists in karate
Pan American Games bronze medalists for Peru
Medalists at the 2019 Pan American Games
Karateka at the 2019 Pan American Games
South American Games gold medalists for Peru
South American Games bronze medalists for Peru
South American Games medalists in karate
Competitors at the 2018 South American Games
Competitors at the 2022 South American Games
21st-century Peruvian women